David Rowland Francis (October 1, 1850January 15, 1927) was an American politician and diplomat. He served in various positions including Mayor of St. Louis, the 27th Governor of Missouri, and United States Secretary of the Interior. He was the U.S. Ambassador to Russia between 1916 and 1917, during the Russian Revolution of 1917. He was a Wilsonian Democrat.

Early life
Francis was born on October 1, 1850, in Richmond, Kentucky, the son of Eliza Caldwell (née Rowland) (1830–1898) and John Broaddus Francis (1818–1894). He graduated from Washington University in St. Louis in 1870 where he was number one on the rolls of the Alpha Iota chapter of Beta Theta Pi fraternity.

Career
After graduating from University, he became a successful businessman in St. Louis and served as the president of a grain merchant's exchange. The St. Louis Mining and Stock Exchange was formed in St. Louis in the fall of 1880 with Francis as a founding member.

In 1885, he was elected mayor of St. Louis as a Democrat. In 1888, he was elected governor of Missouri becoming the only mayor of St. Louis elected governor of the state.

In 1896, Francis was appointed United States Secretary of the Interior by President Grover Cleveland and served until 1897.

World's Fair 1904
Francis was one of the main promoters of the St. Louis World's Fair of 1904, serving as president of the Louisiana Purchase Exposition. Historians generally emphasize the prominence of themes of race and empire, and the Fair's long-lasting impact on intellectuals in the fields of history, art history, architecture and anthropology. From the point of view of the memory of the average person who attended the fair, it primarily promoted entertainment, consumer goods and popular culture.

The 1904 Summer Olympics were held in combination with that Exposition, and by overseeing the opening ceremony, Francis became the only American to open an Olympic Games but never served as president or vice president of the United States.

Later career
In 1905, after being elected president of the Louisiana Purchase Exposition Company, he was sent to Europe by the World's Fair directors to thank kings, emperors, and other rulers for their part in making the exposition a success. He was decorated by the emperors of Germany and Austria and Wilhelmina, the
Queen of the Netherlands.

In 1910, Francis was arrested for non-payment of taxes, but released on bail.

Diplomatic career

President Woodrow Wilson appointed Francis as the last U.S. Ambassador to the Russian Empire between 1916 and 1917. During his time as ambassador, he was almost appointed as U.S. Senator from Missouri.  He served in that post during the Russian Revolution of 1917, and through him the U.S. recognized the brief Russian Republic (and not the subsequent Bolshevik government).

Francis was the final owner of the St. Louis Republic, a morning newspaper which he sold after years of losses to the rival St. Louis Globe-Democrat in 1919.
His biographer, Harper Barnes, summarized his personality:

David R. Francis was a brash, opinionated, stubborn, smart, sometimes foolish, straight-talking, quick-acting, independent-minded, proud, self-made man who represented the United States in Russia for two and a half years, during the most tumultuous era in that country's history. Much of his activity has been shrouded in myth – some of that heroic, more of that comic and tragic.

Personal life
On January 20, 1876, he married the former Jane Perry (1854–1924), the daughter of John Dietz Perry (1815–1895) and a granddaughter of James Earickson, the former Missouri State Treasurer. They had six children: John David Perry (1876–1950), David Rowland, Jr. (1879–1938), Charles Broaddus (1881–1957), Talton Turner (1882–1955), Thomas (1884–1964), and Sidney Rowland Francis (1888–1960).

His wife died in San Antonio, Texas, on March 21, 1924.  Francis died in St. Louis, Missouri, on January 15, 1927. He was buried in Bellefontaine Cemetery.

Legacy

In 1895, the University of Missouri dedicated David R. Francis Quadrangle in honor of the former governor who is credited with keeping the university in Columbia after the fire of Academic Hall in 1892. Francis insisted that the state's land-grant university remain in a central location, rather than moving to Sedalia, as many state legislators desired. Instead, Sedalia was awarded the Missouri State Fair as compensation. A bronze bust of Francis' face sits at the south end of Francis Quad near the steps of Jesse Hall. A popular MU student tradition is to rub Governor Francis' nose before taking a test in order to get an A.

The track/soccer/football stadium at Washington University in St. Louis, as well as the adjacent gymnasium, are named in Francis' honor. Francis Field was the site of the 1904 Summer Olympics; Francis attended the opening ceremony and officially opened the games as the representative for the host nation.

In 1916, he gave  of land to the city of St. Louis, Missouri, as a Christmas gift. It was turned into a park that bears his name.

In recognition of his donation of the land, a memorial statue of Francis was installed in Francis Park in the city of St. Louis, Missouri in August 2018. Francis Park is located within the neighborhood of St. Louis Hills. The bronze sculpture of David R. Francis is the work of American artist and sculptor, Harry Weber. The memorial is supported by the group, Friends of Francis Park.

References
Notes

Sources

 
 

 Francis, David Rowland. The universal exposition of 1904. (Louisiana purchase exposition Company, 1913). online
 Francis, David Rowland. Russia from the American Embassy, April, 1916-November, 1918 (C. Scribner's Sons, 1921).
 Francis, David Rowland, and Jamie H. Cockfield. (1981). Dollars and diplomacy: Ambassador David Rowland Francis and the fall of tsarism, 1916-17 (Durham: Duke University Press).
Francis, David Rowland, Robert Chadwell Williams, and Robert Lester. (1986). Russia in transition: the diplomatic papers of David R. Francis, U.S. Ambassador to Russia, 1916-1918 (Frederick, Md: University Publications of America).

Further reading
 Barnes, Harper. (2001). Standing on a volcano: the life and times of David Rowland Francis (St. Louis: Missouri Historical Society Press in association with the Francis Press. ).

External links

 David R. Francis at St. Louis Public Library: St. Louis Mayors.
 Standing on a Volcano: The Life and Times of David R. Francis by Harper Barnes, October 2001. .
 Missouri State Archives. David Rowland Francis, 1889-1893

|-

|-

|-

|-

1850 births
1927 deaths
People from Richmond, Kentucky
Washington University in St. Louis alumni
Mayors of St. Louis
Democratic Party governors of Missouri
United States Secretaries of the Interior
Ambassadors of the United States to Russia
Presidents of the Organising Committees for the Olympic Games
Cleveland administration cabinet members
19th-century American politicians
Burials at Bellefontaine Cemetery